Lilitha Reed (born 19 May 2002) is a South African cricketer. He made his Twenty20 debut, for Border, on 13 September 2019 in the 2019–20 CSA Provincial T20 Cup.

See also
 List of Border representative cricketers

References

External links
 

2002 births
Living people
South African cricketers
Border cricketers
Cricketers from East London, Eastern Cape